Jill Viola Gascoine (11 April 1937 – 28 April 2020) was an English actress and novelist. She portrayed  Detective Inspector Maggie Forbes in the 1980s television series The Gentle Touch and its spin-off series C.A.T.S. Eyes. In the 1990s, she also became a novelist and published three books.

Early life
Gascoine was born in Lambeth, the daughter of Francis Gascoine, a Quantity Surveyor, and his wife Irene, née Greenwood. She was sent to a boarding school, which she hated, later explaining that she was ridiculed by schoolteachers. After leaving school, in the 1950s, she went to the Edinburgh Festival Fringe to appear in a revue.

Career
Early in her career in the 1950s, Gascoine was a soubrette in a Great Britain tour of the Crazy Gang Show. In 1956, she was a chorus dancer in the Christmas season of The Adventures of Davy Crockett starring Hermione Baddeley, at the Olympia Theatre, Dublin. Gascoine also worked alongside Victor Spinetti in a revue in the Irving Theatre, London. By 1959, Gascoine had taken over from Millicent Martin in a British tour of Expresso Bongo.

Gascoine played one of the schoolgirls in the film The Pure Hell of St Trinian's (1960), although in her twenties by then. She joined the Dundee Repertory Theatre in 1963. While in Dundee, she also appeared in productions of the Downfield Musical Society. Her early work also included collaborations with future film and television director Ken Loach.

From 1970 onwards, Gascoine began appearing on television in series such as Z-Cars, General Hospital, Rooms, Dixon of Dock Green, Softly, Softly: Taskforce and Within These Walls. She had a part in the British sex-comedy Confessions of a Pop Performer (1975) and then had a recurring role playing Letty Gaunt in the BBC period drama The Onedin Line (1976–1979).

She became better known in 1980 when she took the lead role in the ITV drama series The Gentle Touch, playing Detective Inspector Maggie Forbes. This was the first British television drama that centred on a female police officer, coming several months before the BBC's similarly themed Juliet Bravo. The Gentle Touch was a huge ratings hit in the UK and ran for five series until 1984, though Gascoine continued to play Maggie Forbes in the more action-orientated spin-off series C.A.T.S. Eyes from 1985 to 1987. Following this, she then appeared as Judy Schwartz in the final series of the sitcom Home to Roost (1989–1990) opposite John Thaw, and continued to make guest appearances on British television. She also appeared in the film King of the Wind (1990) opposite Richard Harris and Glenda Jackson.

Further stage appearances included playing Dorothy Brock opposite Catherine Zeta-Jones in 42nd Street at the Theatre Royal Drury Lane in London and in the musical Destry playing Frenchie, the role played by Marlene Dietrich in Destry Rides Again.

After a high-profile career that had spanned over twenty years on British television, Gascoine and her second husband, actor Alfred Molina, moved to Los Angeles in the 1990s where she made appearances on US television in series such as Northern Exposure and Touched by an Angel, as well as performing extensively in theatre. Although still living in Los Angeles, she returned to the UK in 2008 to perform at the Edinburgh Festival Fringe in the play Sister Cities at the Gilded Balloon Theatre.

In October 2009, it was announced that Gascoine was joining the BBC One soap opera EastEnders. She was to play the role of Glenda Mitchell, former wife of Archie Mitchell and mother of Ronnie and Roxy, from early 2010. However, during her first day on set, she withdrew from her filming commitments, as she felt that she "lacked the right experience to film such a big continuing drama". The part was re-cast with Glynis Barber.

Novels
In the 1990s, Gascoine began a career as a novelist. Her first novel was Addicted (1994), about a successful television actress in her fifties who embarks on a destructive affair with a younger, half-English/half-Spanish actor in his thirties (Gascoine's real-life widower Alfred Molina is an English actor of Italian/Spanish descent, who was 16 years her junior). This was followed by her second novel, Lilian (1995), about a woman who begins a love affair when she goes on holiday to California with her best friend.

Her third novel was Just Like A Woman (1997), which details the story of Daisy, a middle-aged woman who is being pressured by her family to have an abortion after she falls pregnant in her fifties.

Personal life and death
Gascoine married twice. Her first husband was Dundee hotelier Bill Keith in 1965, with whom she had two sons. However, the marriage ended in 1972. Gascoine was then left to bring up her two sons alone and did not see Keith after they divorced.

In 1982, she met actor Alfred Molina when they were both working in the same theatre production. They later married in Tower Hamlets, London, in 1986.

Gascoine suffered from clinical depression for most of her life, which she believed stemmed from her unhappy time in a boarding school as a child.

In 1997, Gascoine was diagnosed with kidney cancer, though the disease was detected early and she made a full recovery.

In June 2013, Gascoine publicly revealed that she had Alzheimer's disease at a Beverly Hills gala which was set up to raise money to fight the disease. In August 2016 her husband Alfred Molina reported that she was "in a very advanced stage of Alzheimer's", and had been in a specialist care home in Los Angeles for more than two years, where she died on 28 April 2020, aged 83.

Filmography

Film

Television

References

External links

 

1937 births
2020 deaths
Deaths from Alzheimer's disease
Deaths from dementia in California
Actresses from London
English stage actresses
English television actresses
English women novelists
British expatriate actresses in the United States
People from Lambeth